William Wister McKean (19 September 1800 – 22 April 1865) was an admiral in the United States Navy during the American Civil War. He was noted for his service in the Union blockade that effectively closed Confederate seaports in the Gulf of Mexico.

Biography
Born in Pennsylvania, McKean was the grandson of Thomas McKean, the governor of that state.

William Wister McKean was appointed midshipman on 30 November 1814. He served in the Navy from the War of 1812 to the Civil War, when he rose to the rank of flag officer in command of the Gulf Blockading Squadron in early 1862 and later the East Gulf Blockading Squadron. McKean was relieved from active duty on 4 June 1862.

McKean died at Binghamton, New York, 22 April 1865.

Dates of rank
Midshipman - 30 November 1814
Lieutenant - 13 January 1825
Commander - 8 September 1841
Captain - 14 September 1855
Retired List - 27 December 1861
Flag Officer, Retired List - 3 January 1862
Commodore, on Retired List - 16 July, 1862
Died - 22 April 1865

Namesakes
Two ships were named  in his honor.

Notes

References

External links
 

1800 births
1865 deaths
United States Navy officers
People from Huntingdon County, Pennsylvania
People of Pennsylvania in the American Civil War
Union Navy officers